Piotr Fronczewski (born 8 June 1946 in Łódź, Poland), is a Polish actor and a cabaret and theatre singer. He is regarded as one of the greatest and most popular actors of his generation.

Life and career
He was born to a Polish mother, Bogna Duszyńska (1912–2016) and a Polish-Jewish father, Władysław Fronczewski (1900–1969). His father was born as Władysław Finkelstein and changed his last name before the outbreak of World War II. He is a graduate of the Karol Świerczewski Liceum in Warsaw.

Piotr Fronczewski created a fictional character Franek Kimono he issued a disco LP in 1983 which was meant to be a musical joke but turned out to be a great success. Fronczewski started his acting career playing in the theater. He also performed in cabarets. His daughters – Kasia and Magda Fronczewski were very popular child-singers in late 1980s and early 1990s.

From his TV and movie work, he is best known as Pan Kleks (Mr Inkblot), the main character of a series of movies based on books written by Jan Brzechwa and illustrated by Craig Bonner. He also voiced Robert "Bob" Parr Mr. Incredible in the Polish dub of The Incredibles franchise and Diego in the Polish version of the Ice Age film series.

In 1990, Gustaw Holoubek ranked Piotr Fronczewski among the three greatest Polish dramatic actors post-1965 alongside Andrzej Seweryn and Wojciech Pszoniak. He played outstanding leading roles in some films of the prominent Polish directors, e.g. Andrzej Wajda, as well as countless supporting roles in big productions. Also, very well known for his unforgettable role of "Pan Piotrus" in the Cabaret of Olga Lipinska. Later became active and very successful on the Polish Cabaret and Standup Comedy scene. Piotr Fronczewski is known as a master of intelligent humour and snappy retort.

Selected filmography 
 1958 – Wolne miasto as Boguś
 1972 – Boleslaw Smialy as Brother Adalbertus
 1974 – Ziemia Obiecana as von Horn
 1975 – A Woman's Decision as Jan
 1976 – Parada Oszustów as Narrator and additional roles
 1978 – Halo Szpicbródka as Fred Kampinos / Szpicbródka
 1979 – Kung-Fu as Witek Markowski
 1980 – The Moth as Psychiatrist
 1981 – The Quack as Dobraniecki
 1982 – Aby do świtu... as Szczygieł
 1983 – Akademia Pana Kleksa as Professor Ambroży Kleks and Jan Brzechwa
 1983 – Szaleństwa Panny Ewy as dr Hieronim Tyszowski
 1985 – Podróże Pana Kleksa as Professor Ambroży Kleks 
 1987 – Cesarskie cięcie as Dr. Erdman
 1987 – Zabij mnie glino as Zientara
 1988 – Pan Kleks w Kosmosie as Professor Ambroży Kleks 
 1989 –  as Czesław Wiśniak / Jacek Ben Silberstein
 1989 – A Tale of Adam Mickiewicz's 'Forefathers' Eve' as Sobolewski
 1990 – Escape from the 'Liberty' Cinema as Party Secretary
 1994 – Tata, a Marcin powiedział as Dad
 1995 – Awantura o Basię as Stanisław Olszowski
 1997 – Rover Dangerfield as Rover Dangerfield (voice, Polish dub)
 1998 – Billboard as „Kaleka”
 1999 – Lot 001 as Captain
 1999 – Tygrysy Europy as Henryk Laskowski
 1999 – Rodzina zastępcza as Jacek Kwiatkowski
 2001 – Tryumf pana Kleksa as Professor Ambroży Kleks (voice)
 2002 – Day of the Wacko as TV doctor
 2004 – The Incredibles as Bob Parr / Mr. Incredible (voice, Polish dub)
 2006 – Rozmowy z katem as Jürgen Stroop
 2018 – Incredibles 2 as Bob Parr / Mr. Incredible (voice, Polish dub)
 2018 – The Mire as Hotel Manager
 2021 – Kontrakt as the Narrator
 2021 – Pan Kleks. Wojna i milosc as the Narrator

See also
Polish cinema
Polish Film Awards

References

External links 
 IBFP entry
 
 Link to official Franek Kimono project page

1946 births
20th-century Polish male actors
Actors from Łódź
Living people
Polish people of Jewish descent
Polish Roman Catholics
Polish cabaret performers
Polish male film actors
Polish male stage actors
Polish male television actors
Polish theatre directors
Polish male voice actors
Knights of the Order of Polonia Restituta
Recipients of the Gold Cross of Merit (Poland)
Recipients of the Silver Medal for Merit to Culture – Gloria Artis
Polish male soap opera actors
20th-century Polish male singers
Aleksander Zelwerowicz National Academy of Dramatic Art in Warsaw alumni